The 5th Georgia Cavalry Regiment was a cavalry regiment in the Confederate States Army during the American Civil War. It was composed of enlistees from the state of Georgia and served entirely in the Western Theater.

History

The regiment was formed on January 20, 1863, from combining the 1st Battalion, Georgia Cavalry (made up of men from Liberty and McIntosh counties) and the 2nd Battalion (Bulloch, Chatham, Effingham, and Screven counties). However, they were not officially mustered in the service until May 17, 1863, and were afterwards sent to South Carolina and parts of Georgia to defend against Union incursions into those two states.

At the end of August 1863, the entire regiment was sent to South Carolina and assigned to the overall command of General P.G.T. Beauregard. They fought at Johns Island, Charleston, Green Pond, and many other battles within the area. The 5th Cavalry remained in South Carolina until orders sent them back to Savannah on May 13, 1864; along the way, those orders changed and the 5th Georgia Cavalry rode to join General Joseph Wheeler and the Army of Tennessee. Once they had joined Wheeler’s forces, the troops traveled to Atlanta. They participated in the battle for that city and in the greater Atlanta Campaign, where they lost many men. They saw combat in several major subsequent actions, including Kennesaw Mountain, Buckhead, Big Shanty, Chattahoochee River, and Decatur. Their last documented skirmish was the Battle of Morrisville Station on April 13–14, 1865. The regiment surrendered in Hillsboro, North Carolina on April 26, 1865.

James Lord Pierpont served as a Private in Company H.

Companies of the Fifth Georgia Cavalry
 A - "Georgia Hussars" (Chatham County)
 B - "Chatham Light Horse" (Chatham County)
 C - "Blue Cap Cavalry" (Burke County)
 D - "Liberty Guards" (Liberty County)
 E - "Bulloch Troop" (Bulloch County)
 F - "Screven Troop" (Screven County)
 G - "Liberty Independent Troop" (Liberty County)
 H - "Mounted Rifles" (Chatham County)
 I - "Effingham Hussars" (Effingham County)
 K - "McIntosh Light Dragoons" (McIntosh County)

See also
List of Civil War regiments from Georgia

External links
Georgia Cavalry Listing

Units and formations of the Confederate States Army from Georgia (U.S. state)
1863 establishments in Georgia (U.S. state)